Cannabis in Hungary is illegal. There is no distinction in Hungarian law between the dangers of use among illicit drugs. Heroin use has the same legal consequences as cannabis use. Hungarian law prohibits the distribution, and any use (including medical use). However, the Penal code distinguishes the punishment between sale and personal use. 283. § (1) paragraph (a) states that "One cannot be punished for drug misuse; if a small, personal amount is produced, acquired, or in possession..." and continues to state that "... provided that before a final verdict is determined a verification is provided that continuous 6-month therapy has taken place" The law determines that a "personal quantity" is defined as 1 gram of active substance (i.e. THC), therefore this equates to 12–100 grams of marijuana if calculated that marijuana contains 1–8% THC per unit mass. Possession of larger amounts can lead to a 5–10-year prison sentence.

According to a 2019 article, cannabis for medical use is legal in theory, as some Sativex prescriptions have been made, but patients can rarely get it prescribed and the price of Sativex is high.

Since 2013 the possession of 12g-100g cannabis (with approximately 1% THC content) is punishable by up to 8 years in prison. Any amount higher than 100g can result in life in prison.

References

 
Politics of Hungary
Society of Hungary